Niizuma (written: 新妻 lit. "new wife") is a Japanese surname. Notable people with the surname include:

, Japanese politician
, Japanese politician
, Japanese sculptor
, Japanese actress and singer

Japanese-language surnames